Sault Ste. Marie Water Aerodrome  is located adjacent on the St. Marys River in Sault Ste. Marie, Ontario, Canada. It shares its airspace and waterway with neighbouring Sault Ste Marie International Seaplane Base  in the United States.

Sault Ste Marie Water Aerodrome services the Canadian Bushplane Heritage Centre, a museum which features many interactive bush plane, forestry, and aerial firefighting exhibits. Several aircraft are also under restoration at the centre, notably a De Havilland Fox Moth with the registration C-FBNI.

See also
 List of airports in the Sault Ste. Marie, Ontario area

References

Transport in Sault Ste. Marie, Ontario
Registered aerodromes in Algoma District
Seaplane bases in Ontario
Binational airports